Melrose Drive is a station in Oceanside, California that is served by North County Transit District's Sprinter light rail line. The station is located at 1495 N. Melrose Drive. It consists of a single platform and track.

Platforms and tracks

References

External links
SPRINTER Stations

North County Transit District stations
Railway stations in the United States opened in 2008
Oceanside, California
2008 establishments in California